Swansea West is a constituency of the Senedd. It elects one Member of the Senedd by the first past the post method of election. It is also one of seven constituencies in the South Wales West electoral region, which elects four additional members, in addition to seven constituency members, to produce a degree of proportional representation for the region as a whole.

Boundaries

The constituency was created for the first election to the Assembly, in 1999, with the name and boundaries of the Swansea West Westminster constituency. It is entirely within the preserved county of West Glamorgan.

The other six constituencies of the region are Aberavon, Bridgend, Gower, Neath, Ogmore and Swansea East.

Assembly members and Members of the Senedd

Election results

Elections in the 2020s
In general elections for the Senedd, each voter has two votes. The first vote may be used to vote for a candidate to become the Member of the Senedd for the voter's constituency, elected by the first past the post system. The second vote may be used to vote for a regional closed party list of candidates. Additional member seats are allocated from the lists by the d'Hondt method, with constituency results being taken into account in the allocation.

Regional Ballot void votes: 141. Want of an Official Mark (0), Voting for more than ONE party or individual candidate (39), Writing or mark by which the Voter could be identified (14), Unmarked or Void for uncertainty (97)

Elections in the 2010s

Regional ballots rejected: 214

Elections in the 2000s

2003 Electorate: 58,749
Regional ballots rejected: 460

Elections in the 1990s

1999 Electorate: 59,369

Notes

References

Senedd constituencies in the South Wales West electoral region
Politics of Swansea
1999 establishments in Wales
Constituencies established in 1999